The 1990 New Zealand rugby union tour of France was a series of matches played between October and November 1990 in France by New Zealand national rugby union team

Results 
Scores and results list New Zealand's points tally first.

Touring party

Coach: Alex Wyllie
Captain: Gary Whetton

Backs
Shayne Philpott  (Canterbury)
Kieran Crowley  (Taranaki)
John Timu (Otago)
Craig Innes (Auckland)
John Kirwan (Auckland)
Terry Wright (Auckland)
Va'aiga Tuigamala (Auckland)
Bernie McCahill (Auckland)
Walter Little (North Harbour)
Joe Stanley (Auckland)
Grant Fox (Auckland)
Simon Mannix  (Wellington)
Graeme Bachop (Canterbury)
Paul McGahan (North Harbour)

Forwards
Steve McDowall  (Auckland)
Graham Purvis (Waikato)
Olo Brown (Auckland)
Richard Loe (Canterbury)
Laurence Hullena  (Wellington)
Sean Fitzpatrick (Auckland)
Warren Gatland (Waikato)
Gary Whetton (Auckland)
Ian Jones (North Auckland)
Steve Gordon (Waikato)
Murray Pierce (Wellington)
Michael Jones (Auckland)
Mike Brewer (Otago)
Zinzan Brooke (Auckland)
Paul Henderson   (Southland)
Alan Whetton (Auckland)
Rob Gordon (Waikato)

References 

New Zealand national rugby union team tours of Europe
New Zealand
Rugby union tour
Tour
Rugby union tours of France